BUKO Stadion (also known by its former names: Rabobank IJmond Stadion, TATA Steel Stadion, and (Sportpark) Schoonenberg Stadion ) is the home ground of the Dutch Eerste Divisie (first-division) football team SC Telstar. It is located in Velsen-Zuid, Netherlands. It was opened in 1948, with minor renovations in 1999.

The stadium, with a capacity of 5,200, consists of an all-seater east stand, a small terraced south stand, and an all-seater west stand. On the south stand are no seats.  The latter stand was built in 2009 and has several built-in features, including new changing rooms, offices, and improved sponsor seating.

Since the first of Januari 2021, BUKO is the main sponsor of the football team, and subsequently the stadium was named BUKO Stadion.

References

Football venues in the Netherlands
Sports venues in North Holland
SC Telstar